Spongin, a modified type of collagen protein, forms the fibrous skeleton of most organisms among the phylum Porifera, the sponges. It is secreted by sponge cells known as spongocytes.

Spongin gives a sponge its flexibility. True spongin is found only in members of the class Demospongiae.

Research directions

Use in the removal of phenolic compounds from wastewater 
Researchers have found spongin to be useful in the photocatalytic degradation and removal of  bisphenols (such as BPA) in wastewater. A heterogeneous catalyst consisting of a spongin scaffold for iron phthalocyanine (SFe) in conjunction with peroxide and UV radiation has been shown to remove phenolic wastes more quickly and efficiently than conventional methods. Other research using spongin scaffolds for the immobilization of Trametes versicolor Laccase has shown similar results in phenol degradation.

References

Marine biology
Collagens